is a Japanese eroge studio based in Sapporo, Hokkaidō.  Games produced by the studio often reach high positions on Japanese sales charts, even gaining the top rank among eroge, but as of 2019, none have been officially released outside Japan.

History 
Eushully was organised in 1998 as a development team within Arkham Products.  In March 2005, the members of the team made the decision to incorporate as the limited company Eukleia under the direction of Yukihiro Fujiwara.

The company mainly produces JRPG themed games with their most famous franchise being Ikusa Megami.

Games produced 
 (Released January 29, 1999)
 (Released June 9, 2000)
 (Released April 27, 2001)
 (Released October 25, 2002)
 (Released December 19, 2003)
 (Released November 26, 2004)
 (Released September 16, 2005)
 (Released August 25, 2006)
 (Released June 13, 2008)
 (Released April 24, 2009)
 (Released April 23, 2010)
 (Released April 22, 2011)
 (Released April 27, 2012)
 (Released April 26, 2013)
 (Released April 25, 2014)
 (Released April 24, 2015)
 (Released April 28, 2016)
 (Released May 26, 2017)
 (Released November 30, 2018)

Reviews and criticism 

The studio's first game, War Goddess, met with primarily neutral or somewhat negative reviews, due to technical issues, repetitive music, and the story, which was regarded as mediocre at best.  Some sources cited the original nature of the battle system and well-produced CG images as positive aspects.

War Goddess 2 received fairly positive reviews for its characters and gameplay system, but was criticized as, like its predecessor, having a weak main plot and requiring excessive time to be spent on levelling in order to advance.

Maid in Bunny was praised for its art and Zelda-like gameplay; the most common complaint was of the game being too short.

References 

Hentai companies
Mass media in Sapporo